The Route nationale 202 is a  trunk road (nationale) in France between the Côte d'Azur and the winter sports resort towns in the southern Alps.

202